Bagdadia eucalla is a moth in the family Gelechiidae. It was described by Hou-Hun Li and Zhe-Min Zheng in 1998. It is found in Korea and China (Shaanxi, Guizhou) and Japan.

The length of the forewings is 3.6-8.8 mm for males and 3.8 mm for females. The forewings are pale fuscous, scattered with whitish grey and with an orange scale projecting tuft on the subcosta near the base. There are four fuscous marks on the costa and a large fuscous oval blotch on the cell, surrounded with whitish grey. The hindwings are pale brownish grey.

References

Moths described in 1998
Bagdadia